Atrosalarias fuscus, also known as the dusky blenny, brown coral blenny or black blenny, is a species of marine fish in the family Blenniidae.

It is widespread throughout the tropical waters of the Indian Ocean, Red Sea included.

This fish is a small size that can reach a maximum size of 14.5 cm length.

References

External links
 

fuscus
Fish described in 1838